Road to Andalay is a 1964 Warner Bros. Merrie Melodies animated short directed by Friz Freleng and Hawley Pratt. The short was released on December 26, 1964, and is one of the last shorts to feature Speedy Gonzales and Sylvester.

Plot
Speedy Gonzales and Sylvester are chasing around. Speedy scares Sylvester and forces him to fall off the edge.

In an attempt to capture Speedy Gonzales, Sylvester goes to the Pet Shop to get a secret weapon. Sylvester acquires a hunting bird, a falcon named Malcolm Falcon, with disastrous results. Malcolm gets upset with Sylvester so he pecked Sylvester's head. Sylvester tells Malcolm to save it. Speedy comes up to ask, "Hello Pussycats, what you got in the bag?" Sylvester answers by releasing Malcolm the Falcon.

Malcolm tries to catch the mouse but misses. A plane flies by and sucks the falcon in. Sylvester helps the falcon recover and Malcolm pecks on Sylvester's head again.

Speedy tells Sylvester that he has a secret underneath his hat. As Sylvester tries to guess what it is underneath Speedy's hat. Sylvester talks to himself while the falcon brings him a stick of dynamite., After the explosion Malcolm pecks on Sylvester's head again.

Malcolm tries to get the mouse again, but Speedy puts salt on the falcon's tail. To prove to Malcolm that's just a superstition, Sylvester puts the salt on his own tail. Speedy then tells them to wag their tails. The falcon wiggles his tail and it comes off, then the cat's tail wiggles and comes off, the latter of which Speedy finds hilarious. Sylvester and Malcolm then head back to town to get glue to put their tails back on. While laughing at the sight, Speedy is unaware that salt is pouring on his tail, until it also falls off. Chasing after Sylvester and Malcom, he cries "Amigos, wait, wait, save some glue for me." and the short fades out.

Crew
Co-Director: Hawley Pratt
Story: John Dunn
Animation: Norm McCabe, Don Williams, Bob Matz, Wolfgang Reitherman, Ward Kimball
Assistant Layout: Homer Jonas
Background: Tom O'Loughlin
Camera: John Burton, Jr.
Film Editor: Lee Gunther
Production Manager: Bill Orcutt
Voice Characterizations: Mel Blanc
Music: Bill Lava
Produced by: David H. DePatie & Friz Freleng
Directed by: Friz Freleng

References

External links 
 

1964 animated films
1964 short films
Speedy Gonzales films
Sylvester the Cat films
Short films directed by Friz Freleng
Merrie Melodies short films
DePatie–Freleng Enterprises short films
1964 films
Animated films about mice
Animated films about cats
Animated films about birds
Films set in Mexico
Films scored by William Lava
1960s Warner Bros. animated short films
1960s English-language films